Berisford is a surname Meaning "Ford Where Barley Grows" . Notable people with the surname include:

Humphrey Berisford (died  1588), English recusant
Norman Berisford (born 1928), English architect, painter, writer, poet, and philanthropist

See also
Beresford (disambiguation)
Berrisford